Nymlal (also spelled Nyamlell) is a populated place in the Northern Bahr el Ghazal state in South Sudan, north-west of the town of Aweil on the banks of the Lol River.

Nymlal, situated in the Aweil West district, has a marketplace. Most of the people in and around Nymlal are black African Dinka people. The name Nymlal has the meaning of "the place where stones are eaten".

According to Francis Bok and human rights organizations, Nymlal was raided several times by "Arab" slave hunters from northern Sudan during the Second Sudanese Civil War.

Populated places in Northern Bahr el Ghazal
Bahr el Ghazal